Berthe Dagmar (1884–1934) was a French film actress. She was married to the director Jean Durand.

Selected filmography
 Island of Love (1929)

References

Bibliography
 Rège, Philippe. Encyclopedia of French Film Directors, Volume 1. Scarecrow Press, 2009.

External links

1884 births
1934 deaths
French film actresses